Youth work is a community support activity aimed at older children and adolescents. Depending upon the culture and the community, different services and institutions may exist for this purpose. In general, it provides an environment where young people can engage in informal educational activities. Throughout the United Kingdom, United States, and Canada, youth work is "to facilitate personal, educational, and social development." Through participative activities and coordinated programs, it seeks to enable young people in "gaining a voice, influence, and place in society in a period of their transition from dependence to independence." By nature and design these activities would be inclusive, educative, and empowering, and based on partnership, equality of opportunity, and respecting diversity.

Overview

"Youth work" is defined as activities that intentionally seek to impact young people. This is primarily a set of loosely affiliated activities that have been defined, redefined, examined, and reinvented in subsequent generations. 

In Ireland the Youth Work Act of 2001 states that,

"'Youth work' means a planned programme of education designed for the purpose of aiding and enhancing the personal and social development of young persons through their voluntary participation, and which (a) complements their formal, academic, or vocational education and training; and (b) is provided primarily by voluntary youth work organisations."

However, critics of this particular definition report need for expansion of the limited view,

"Youth work should aim to engage with society and bring about social change in an unequal society."

Some critics report that youth work should seek youth participation in justice, equality, and youth empowerment through political engagement. They say youth should be liberated with orientation in critical analysis of local and global influences (globalization) in their lives and in their communities. Others like Julius Nyerere say education, the educative aspect of youth work should be a voluntary pursuit of the youth for it to be a tool of personal and social liberation.

Youth work is historically said to focus on five areas, including a focus on young people; an emphasis on voluntary participation and relationship; a commitment to association by youth and adults; friendly and informal atmospheres, and; acting with integrity.

History

Youth work often emphasises the need to involve young people in the running of their own services through a process of youth-led youth work.  Historically there are a number of different motives for the development of youth work in the UK.  First, early youth workers, often from the middle classes,  frequently saw working with deserving young people as an expression of their Christian faith.  Secondly there was a concern to instill a middle class set of values in working class youth.

This early approach to youth work has actually been around since the birth of the Industrial Revolution in the 19th century, which was the first time that young men left their own homes and cottage industries to migrate to the big towns.  The result of this migration was an emergent youth culture in urban areas, which locally was responded to by the efforts of local people.  Although with the formation of the YMCA (and later Scouting) organisations were founded whose sole aim was to address these issues, the emphasis was always on providing for young people.

A government review of the Youth Service, set up in November 1958 and chaired by Lady Albemarle, was published in 1960. It argued cogently for specific kinds of provision to be provided by local councils and ushered in a significant building boom of new premises for youth work. Often thought of as a golden age, the period following the Albemarle report was a time of thriving centre-based youth work.

Today (as outlined in the Transforming Youth Work document released in 1998 by the DfES) it is the statutory duty of all local government organisations to provide a youth service in their region.  Also for the first time the youth service has national targets that have to be met with regard to the reach (initial contact) with young people, the number of relationships developed with young people and the number of accredited learning programmes achieved through the youth service.

In 1999 in the UK the main national professional organisations and trades union (CYWU) agreed to join other professional bodies representing informal education practitioners (community workers, community based adult educators, community educators), to create a UK wide National Training Organisation called PAULO (named in honour of the educator Paulo Freire. PAULO was formally approved by the Government to set the occupational training standards for all people working in this employment sector. In 2002 PAULO formed part of the Lifelong Learning UK Sector Skills Council.

Approaches to youth work

Community youth work

Community youth workers provide community-based activities for young people in a variety of settings throughout local communities, including places of worship, nonprofit organizations and government agencies.

Youth empowerment

Youth empowerment is the deliberate granting of authority to young people by adults. This may take the form of youth leadership in program or organizational planning, research, design, facilitation or evaluation. This youth-centered approach has been shown to be particularly effective at promoting and sustaining youth engagement and for its efficacy across cultural, social and other boundaries.

Schemes associated with youth empowerment include programs various types of youth participation throughout organizations, governments and schools. This includes involving youth as planners, researchers, teachers, evaluators, decision-makers and advocates.

Centre-based youth work

This youth work is carried out at a dedicated premises, which may include facilities such as drop-in coffee bars, sports facilities and advice centres.  Most youth clubs fall under this fairly wide category.  It is reliant on young people choosing to come to the centre, but in some cases may be linked with outreach or school-based youth work.

Faith-based youth work
This youth work is carried out from a foundation of religious morals and may be for the purpose of sharing or engendering religious views. In the Christian church the main purpose of faith-based youth work may be derived from the biblical commandment to "love your neighbour."
In many faith-based situations the main agenda or purpose of youth work is aligned with the spiritual goals of the religion, or the perceived progress of a young person toward these goals. In Northern Ireland, 64% of youth work is faith-based.

Detached youth work
In its purest form, detached youth work is a form of street-based youth work provision that operates without the use of a centre and takes place where young people "are at" both geographically and developmentally. It is often confused with outreach work because of the similar principles, i.e. making contact on the streets with those "hard to reach" or "unattached" young people. Detached work is seen as more than trying to encourage young people to utilise existing provision (which is the often used definition of Outreach work) and is used as a method of delivering informal and social education and is concerned with addressing whatever needs are presented to or perceived by the youth worker.

Also referred to as "street work" by some European, North and South American practitioners, modern detached work appears to have been influenced in Great Britain and Ireland by early contributions from the United States, and in particular, accounts of the work carried out by the Welfare Council of New York  with street gangs in the 1950s became some of the earliest literature available on the subject of street-based work.  Street work has, however, always,  since its earliest incarnations, had a role to play in youth work.

However, it is important to note that contributors on the subject, such as those referenced above, e.g. (Kaufman, 2001) & (Smith, 1996.) have discussed the ambiguity surrounding the titling of such forms of work and the regular confusion around which form of work is which and indeed as Smith himself states "There has been a good deal of dispute over how to label the work described here. The problem with notions such as 'detached' is that it could still be seen as making the youth centre or traditional youth organization the basic reference point. (These are what the workers are detached from). Furthermore, the titling adds to the stereotypical view of detached workers as 'mavericks' who float free of attachment. The reality of practice is that a central feature of the work is the process of becoming attached - to a neighbourhood, groups of young people, local community members and so on.  To this can be added the pretty pointless debate between 'detached' and 'outreach' work. The latter, it is sometimes said, is mainly concerned with bringing people into existing organizations and activities; the former is about 'working with people where they are at'. In reality most 'detached' workers have to use existing organizations, and have a range of activities that people can plug into. Some care is needed around this area...Most detached workers have some sort of office and base (with group rooms etc.) Furthermore their contact making may well be 'off the street' in schools, various commercial leisure environments, and in people's homes".
Reproduced from the encyclopaedia of informal education http://www.infed.org
Adding to this debate is the fact that while there exists much support for street-based provision there is few definitions in existence to clearly distinguish the differences (if any) between 'Outreach' and 'Detached' work. That said, the Scottish Executive in 1998 commissioned The Princes Trust to carry out a National Development Project to develop Best Practice guidelines and methods to monitor, evaluate and create a National focus for Outreach and Detached Youth Work.  Through their research they offered this clear and simple definition for detached work, that is adequate for all those who are unfamiliar with this type of youth work provision,
"Detached youth work is a model of youth work practice, targeted at vulnerable young people, which takes place on young people’s own territory such as streets, cafes, parks and pubs at times that are appropriate to them and on their terms.  It begins from where young people are in terms of their values, attitudes, issues and ambitions and is concerned with their personal and social development. It is characterised by purposeful interaction between youth workers and young people and utilises a range of youth and community work methods".

Outreach youth work

Similar to detached youth work, outreach is a form of youth work that takes place on young people’s own territory  and is a method of work that supports and compliments new and existing centre/project based youth work. Primarily used to inform young people of services that exist in their locality and to encourage them to use such services, Outreach can also seek to identify, through consultation with young people, any gaps that exist in services aimed at meeting their needs.As opposed to Detached Youth Work, Outreach is seen as an extension to centre-based work
, Outreach work takes place when workers who are usually centre based go onto the streets with an agenda of their own to pursue, usually to encourage young people to attend their club.

As highlighted above there are few definitions available to clearly distinguish the differences between Outreach and Detached work and according to The Princes Trust's research for the Scottish Executive, the reason for this may be partly due to the similarities in the places where the work is carried out (on the streets, in parks and cafes) and the fact that both models work with the same target groups of young people (those who are disaffected or alienated).  Furthermore, the research points out that "There is even some evidence from fieldwork that there can be an occasional overlap in practice between the two modes of work. For these and other reasons, definitions have received less emphasis in the literature than the principles and intentions of each of these modes of work".

School-based work

This form of youth work is carried out in schools and is provided directly for the pupils, often by an organisation external from the school.  It may include lessons, assemblies, after-school clubs, one to one mentoring etc.  There may be a link with other non-school youth activities.

Youth development

Youth development programs seek to identify the needs of young people from a social/educational perspective, and to meet those needs through structured, intentional activities that satisfy those needs. This area includes community youth development and positive youth development activities.

Youth worker

Youth workers are people active in the field of youth work. The work includes orientation of young people to the adult world through socialisation, dismantling exclusion, and connecting them with resources needed for growth and development. Hence youth workers would hold different roles and use different set of skills and resources to attain youth work objectives. Different types of youth work is facilitated through centre-based work, detached work, school-based work, religion based work, etc.

References 

 
Alternative education
Learning